Cal Yachts (also known as Jensen Marine and Cal Boats) was a manufacturer of performance oriented fiberglass sailboats from the 1960s to the 1980s.  The Costa Mesa, California, headquartered company was founded in 1957, among the earliest of all-fiberglass, mass-production sailboat builders.  Although the brand has been out of production since 1989, the existing fleet is still substantially active in racing and cruising.

History

Cal Yachts was originally named the Jensen Marine Corporation after the founder, Jack Jensen, a fiberglass boat builder.  He sold his company to Bangor Punta Corporation in 1968.  Jensen later produced Ranger sailboats and a line of molded fiberglass recreational vehicles called "Balboa".

Nearly 18,000 boats were built under the Cal brand name.  There were many different models – the first of the ultra-light, production ocean racers, the Cal 40 was inspired by ocean racer George Griffith, of the Los Angeles Yacht Club. Following Griffith's initial design, the Cal 40 was developed by naval architect C. William "Bill" Lapworth. Griffith sought out Jack Jensen to build the first boat, Persephone, but had to guarantee the sale of ten boats, which was quickly accomplished, even before the first boat was out of the mold.  Lofting was performed by Willis Boyd. A major undertaking for its time and radically different from other production racing sailboats with its fin keel separated from a spade rudder mounted well aft, the Cal 40 astonished the yachting community by Don Salisbury's Hull #3 "Psyche" winning first overall in the 1965 Transpac with Griffith aboard. The Cal40 continues to rack up an impressive string of ocean racing victories more than four decades after its initial launch, winning major competitions such as the Newport-Bermuda Race as recently as 2008. Among other ocean racing classics, Cal 40s still compete as a class in the Transpac from Los Angeles to Honolulu and in 2005 recorded 14 entries, more than any other production sailboat at any time in the century-long history of this, America's longest-running ocean yacht race.

The Cal 34 was also designed by Bill Lapworth. It was originally designed as a well built comfortable coastal cruising boat with a roomy cabin layout, large V-berth, and large cockpit. There were upgrades and improvements to the 34 over the last few years of its production to make it better for bluewater and long range cruising, with the hull being strengthened, a redesigned cockpit with a strong bridge deck and the steel support beam replaced with aluminum, but the hull shape remained the same.  with the 34-III model was last produced in 1979. The Mk III model has its hull laid up stronger it could take more ballast but with sail area slightly reduced, so with having an SA/Disp ratio of 16.38, a Disp/L ratio of 259.08 and a ballast/disp ratio of 45.58, it is set up well to be a much stronger ocean cruiser than the first model, with good performance in speed and pointing ability, and a more than adequate righting ability. The later models had, in addition to more ballast, a higher aspect rig, and a newer and more comfortable cabin layout.

Also worthy of mention as a popular model, is the Cal 27.

The Jensen-Lapworth collaboration resulted in some competitive racer/cruiser sailboats. If the PHRF ratings below are compared to those of recent hull designs, it will be found that the Cal designs are relatively fast boats. This is one of the reasons these ruggedly built and surprisingly affordable boats remain popular nearly fifty years after they first appeared in the recreational marine marketplace.

The Cal 20 Fleet recently celebrated its 50th year concluding its National Championship regatta with 53 boats entered at Alamitos Bay and Long Beach Yacht Clubs in Southern California.

Models

In popular culture
All Is Lost, the 2013 American survival film written and directed by J. C. Chandor and starring Robert Redford, includes turtling and sinking of the Cal 39 sailboat and the liferaft amidst the myriad disasters befalling the protagonist. Three of the yachts were used in production.

See also
 List of sailboat designers and manufacturers
 Ranger Yachts, another yacht manufacturing business by Jensen

References

Further reading
 Spurr, Daniel. Heart of GLASS, Fiberglass Boats And The Men Who Made Them, Ragged Mountain Press; 1999  
 Mate, Ferenc. Best Boats to Build or Buy, Albatros Publishing House, 1982
 Jones, Gregory. The American Sailboat, MBI Publishing, 2002

External links
 CalBoats.org website that covers the history of Jensen Marine

Cal Yachts